John Edinson Varela Prado (born September 6, 1987 in Cali) is a Colombian footballer who began his playing career at Uruguayan club River Plate de Montevideo and then returned to Colombia where he played for Cortuluá, Deportivo Pasto and Rionegro Águilas.

References
 
 

1987 births
Living people
Footballers from Cali
Colombian footballers
Association football midfielders
Club Atlético River Plate (Montevideo) players
Cortuluá footballers
Deportivo Pasto footballers
Águilas Doradas Rionegro players
Uruguayan Primera División players
Categoría Primera A players
Colombian expatriate footballers
Expatriate footballers in Uruguay